Saidapet railway station is one of the railway stations of the Chennai Beach–Chengelpet section of the Chennai Suburban Railway Network. It serves the neighbourhoods of Saidapet and Little Mount.

History
Saidapet railway station was constructed when the suburban railway service between Madras Beach and Tambaram was opened on 11 May 1931, and the tracks were electrified on 15 November 1931. The section was converted to 25 kV AC traction on 15 January 1967.

See also

 Chennai Suburban Railway
 Railway stations in Chennai

References

External links
Saidapet railway station on Indiarailinfo.org

Stations of Chennai Suburban Railway
Railway stations in Chennai